Neuental is a municipality in the Schwalm-Eder district in Hesse, Germany.

Geography
Neuental lies in the Schwalm river valley between Borken and Schwalmstadt south of Kassel.

Constituent communities
The community consists of the eight centres of Bischhausen, Dorheim, Gilsa, Neuenhain, Römersberg, Schlierbach, Waltersbrück and Zimmersrode (administrative seat).

History
The community came into being as part of Hesse's municipal reforms with the amalgamation of the formerly independent communities of Bischhausen, Dorheim, Gilsa, Neuenhain, Römersberg, Schlierbach, Waltersbrück and Zimmersrode into a new greater community of Neuental.

Politics

Municipal council

Neuental municipal council is made up of 23 councillors.
SPD 9 seats
CDU 8 seats
Bürgerliste (citizens' coalition) 4 seats
FDP 2 seats
(as of municipal elections held on 26 March 2006)

The current mayor is Dr. Philipp Rottwilm (SPD), elected in 2017.

Economy and infrastructure

Transport
Federal Highway (Bundesstraße) B 254 (Homberg – Fulda) runs 7 km to the east. The Neuental interchange on Autobahn A 49 (Kassel – Fritzlar – Marburg) is 3 km away.

Culture 
Inclusivity

One of Marburg’s most important institutions is Philipps University. Philipps University has several courses designed for people with disabilities, blind and partially sighted students. Marburg is exceptionally friendly to visually impaired visitors. In addition to Braille city maps, tours for the blind and partially sighted, and a specially adapted.

References

Schwalm-Eder-Kreis